Earl Homer Sheely (February 12, 1893 – September 16, 1952) was a first baseman for the Chicago White Sox (1921–27), Pittsburgh Pirates (1929) and Boston Braves (1931).

Sheely finished sixth in voting for the 1925 American League MVP, playing in 153 games with having 600 at-bats, 93 runs, 189 hits, 43 doubles, 3 triples, 9 home runs, 111 RBI, 3 stolen bases, 68 walks, .315 batting average, .389 on-base percentage, .442 slugging percentage, 265 total bases and 26 sacrifice hits.

He currently ranks 92nd on the MLB list for career sacrifice hits (189).

Over nine seasons, Sheely played in 1,234 games and had 4,471 at-bats, 572 runs, 1,340 hits, 244 doubles, 27 triples, 48 home runs, 745 RBI, 33 stolen bases, 563 walks, .300 batting average, .383 on-base percentage, .399 slugging percentage, 1,782 total bases and 189 sacrifice hits. Defensively, he recorded a .991 fielding percentage at first base.

He also served as a scout for the Boston Red Sox and general manager of the Seattle Rainiers, a Pacific Coast League team.

Sheely is an inductee of the Pacific Coast League Hall of Fame.

He died in Seattle, Washington, at the age of 59.

Personal life
Sheely's son Bud was a catcher for the White Sox from 1951 to 1953.

Sources

1893 births
1952 deaths
Baseball players from Illinois
Baseball players from Seattle
Boston Braves players
Boston Red Sox scouts
Chicago White Sox players
Major League Baseball first basemen
Pittsburgh Pirates players
Portland Beavers players
Sacramento Solons managers
Sacramento Senators players
Saint Mary's Gaels baseball coaches
Salt Lake City Bees players
San Francisco Seals (baseball) players
Seattle Giants players
Seattle Indians players
Spokane Indians players
Walla Walla Bears players
People from Bushnell, Illinois